Eriplatymetra coloradaria is a species of geometrid moth in the family Geometridae. It is found in North America.

The MONA or Hodges number for Eriplatymetra coloradaria is 6852.

References

Further reading

 

Ourapterygini
Articles created by Qbugbot
Moths described in 1867